Hambone is a small literary magazine that has published major poets. The magazine is edited by poet Nathaniel Mackey.

Writing in The Nation magazine, John Palattella described Hambone as "an indispensable little magazine that for more than a quarter-century has featured work by everyone from Sun Ra, Robert Duncan, and Beverly Dahlen to Edward Kamau Brathwaite and Susan Howe."

History and profile
The magazine's first issue was published in the spring of 1974 under another name as a group effort by the Committee on Black Performing Arts at Stanford University. It was dormant for several years before Mackey renamed it Hambone and revived it as a significantly different journal. The second issue appeared in the fall of 1982, with Mackey as sole editor and publisher. Since then it has appeared irregularly, a bit less than one issue per year.

Although the Fall 1982 issue of the magazine was the first with the Hambone name, Mackey called it Hambone 2. It included work by Sun Ra, fiction by Clarence Major, Wilson Harris and poems by Robert Duncan, Beverly Dahlen, Jay Wright, and  Kamau Brathwaite.

In a 1991 interview, Mackey said, "Whether it will go on my whole life? I'm pretty sure that it won't. I don't know how much longer it will go on." The magazine was still in existence; however, with the publication of Hambone 19 on November 15, 2009.

Notes

External links
 Hambone at the Chimurenga Library

1974 establishments in California
Annual magazines published in the United States
Literary magazines published in the United States
Poetry magazines published in the United States
Irregularly published magazines published in the United States
Magazines established in 1974
Magazines published in California